Guillermo Casanova (21 May 1918 – 16 July 1981) was a Chilean footballer. He played in five matches for the Chile national football team in 1942. He was also part of Chile's squad for the 1942 South American Championship.

References

External links
 

1918 births
1981 deaths
Chilean footballers
Chile international footballers
Place of birth missing
Association football midfielders
Santiago Morning footballers